The Allard J2X-C, or the Allard J2X as it is sometimes referred to, was a Group C sports racing car built by Allard in 1992 for use in international sports car racing events. The J2X-C had bodywork that is more reminiscent of modern Le Mans Prototypes than a conventional Group C car, but the engine proved too weak for the level of downforce, and this, coupled with the fact that Allard Holdings were liquidated during the car's development, severely restricted the J2X and prevented it ever reaching its potential. One car was built.

Development
In the 1980s, Chris Humberstone, who had a history of designing cars for various Formula One teams, licensed the rights to the Allard name from Alan Allard, the son of the company's founder, Sidney. After a few years of wrangling, the company hired Hayden Burvill from Brun Technics to begin developing the J2X-C. He was joined in 1991 by John Iley, who was hired as the aerodynamicist, and the car was designed to have as little frontal area as possible, giving it a unique look. The gearbox was also from an F1 car: a Leyton House-March Engineering 6-speed sequential manual transmission modified for endurance racing. This transmission would prove to be problematic throughout the car's lifetime.

The J2X-C used double wishbone suspension, with push-rod actuated coil springs over dampers at both ends of the car; the front suspension was mounted on the carbon-fibre monocoque, whilst the rear suspension was mounted to a carbon-fibre sub-structure that had been designed to allow quick transmission replacement.

Racing history
Terai Engineering attempted to enter the J2X-C at the 500 km of Suzuka in April 1992, but the car was far from ready, and did not attend. The J2X-C was first tested on 9 July 1992, with Costas Los selected to drive it at Pembrey Circuit. He said of the car; "the J2X felt very different to a regular Group C car... Contrary to most Group C cars I had driven, it was a lot more tuneable than I was accustomed to." However, he did state that the car's lack of power-assisted steering was a problem. The team struggled to find a buyer for the car, as the Group C era was drawing to a close by 1992 and 1993; the IMSA GTP Championship was on its last legs, and the World Sportscar Championship was beginning to shift away from the category.

With the J2X-C far from being completely developed, Allard Holdings were liquidated in the first quarter of 1993, and the car was sold to Robs Lamplough for £76,000. The car's lack of straightline speed, due to a combination of undeveloped aerodynamics, the high level of downforce, and the low power of the engine, would restrict the car's racing career even further. After Lamplough had bought the car, he ran the car in the test session for the 1993 24 Hours of Le Mans; however, he was only able to finish 19th overall, and last in the car's category, even lapping slower than four of the GT cars. The car was clocked at just  down the Mulsanne Straight, and this led to Lamplough opting to not run in the 24 Hours of Le Mans race. Instead, Lamplough debuted the car, with assistance from Bob Pond Racing, at the ninth round of the IMSA GTP Championship, held at Laguna Seca Raceway; ninth place overall, and last in the GTP category, was the best Lamplough could do with the car. The car never raced again.

Later history and legacy
Lamplough held onto the J2X-C for a while, but eventually sold the car, which then passed through the hands of several owners before ending up in Canada. Although even conventional rivals such as the Toyota TS-010 were able to develop more downforce, the J2X-C was far from the end of its development, and various other companies had considered developing a similar style of car. Most manufacturers considered the radical bodywork just too great a risk, as Spice Engineering's lead designer, Graham Humphries, stated; "With limited resources, it was decided instead to follow the more conventional route of further developing what we knew." However, Le Mans Prototypes of the early 2000s and beyond, such as the Audi R8, the Lola B01/60 and the Lola B05/40 have all been said to use some of the lessons learned in the J2X-C.

The J2X-C was, as of 2008, in running order having been fully restored, and ran in the 2007 Goodwood Festival of Speed, as part of the Group C 25th Anniversary celebration.

References

Group C cars
J2X-C
IMSA GTP cars